Cuchillo Negro Creek is a stream in Sierra County, in the U.S. state of New Mexico. The stream is a tributary of the Rio Grande.

The stream flows south to southeast passing Chise and Cuchillo. It continues, passing northeast of the Mud Springs Mountains and crossing under I-25 to its confluence adjacent to New Mexico State Road 51.

The creek derives its name from Cuchillo Negro ("black knife"), an Apache chief.

See also
List of rivers of New Mexico

References

Rivers of Sierra County, New Mexico
Rivers of New Mexico